Pema Khandu (born 21 August 1979) is an Indian politician and the Chief Minister of Arunachal Pradesh. He is son of former Chief Minister of Arunachal Pradesh Dorjee Khandu. Since assuming office of chief minister in July 2016, he and his government have twice changed their party affiliation; in September from the Indian National Congress to the Peoples Party of Arunachal, and then in December 2016 to the Bharatiya Janata Party. Previously he had served as Minister of Tourism, Urban Development and Water Resources in Nabam Tuki's government.

Personal life
Khandu is the eldest son of former Chief Minister Dorjee Khandu, who died in a helicopter accident on 30 April 2011 on a constituency visit to Tawang. He is a graduate from Hindu College (Delhi University). Khandu is a Buddhist by religion.

Career

Indian National Congress
Post his father's death, Khandu was included in the state government as Cabinet Minister for Water Resource Development and Tourism. He won the by election to his father's constituency uncontested Mukto on 30 June 2011 as an Indian National Congress candidate.

Khandu became a secretary of the Arunachal Pradesh Congress Committee in 2005 and the Tawang District Congress Committee president in 2010. He was elected Congress Legislature Party leader on 16 July 2016 replacing Nabam Tuki.

Khandu was re-elected unopposed from Mukto in the 2014 Arunachal Pradesh Legislative Assembly election. 

Khandu took the oath as the chief minister of Arunachal Pradesh on 17 July 2016 at the age of 36 years following a year-long political crisis.

Peoples Party of Arunachal 

On 16 September 2016, 43 MLAs from the ruling party, under the CM Pema Khandu, defected from Indian National Congress to People's Party of Arunachal, an ally of Bharatiya Janata Party.

Bharatiya Janata Party

On 21 December 2016 in a high octane drama Khandu was suspended from the party by the party president and Takam Pario was named as the next likely Chief Minister of Arunachal Pradesh replacing Khandu after People's Party of Arunachal suspended Khandu along with 6 other MLAs.

In December 2016, Khandu proved majority on the floor of the house with 33 of the People's Party of Arunachal’s 43 legislators joining the Bharatiya Janata Party as the BJP increased its strength to 45  with support of two independents as it had 11 MLAs already.  He became second Chief Minister of Arunachal Pradesh of Bharatiya Janata Party in Arunachal Pradesh after 44 days Gegong Apang led government in 2003.

In 2019 Arunachal Pradesh Legislative Assembly election, Khandu won a landslide victory for Bharatiya Janata Party by winning 41 of 60 seats and its allies Janata Dal (United) with 7 states and National People's Party won 4 seats. Khandu took oath as Arunachal Pradesh Chief Minister on 29 May 2019.

Football
Khandu also serves as the President of the Arunachal Pradesh Football Association since 2019.

References 

People from Tawang district
Bharatiya Janata Party politicians from Arunachal Pradesh
Chief ministers from Bharatiya Janata Party
Chief ministers from Indian National Congress
Chief Ministers of Arunachal Pradesh
Chief ministers from People's Party of Arunachal
Arunachal Pradesh MLAs 2014–2019
People's Party of Arunachal politicians
Living people
1979 births
Indian Buddhists
20th-century Buddhists
21st-century Buddhists
Arunachal Pradesh MLAs 2009–2014
Arunachal Pradesh MLAs 2019–2024
Indian football executives